Henrik Rasmussen is the name of:

Henrik Rasmussen (footballer), Danish footballer
Henrik Rasmussen (politician), Danish politician